Yoan López Leyva (born January 2, 1993) is a Cuban professional baseball pitcher for the Yomiuri Giants of Nippon Professional Baseball (NPB). He has previously played in Major League Baseball (MLB) for the Arizona Diamondbacks and the New York Mets.

Career

Arizona Diamondbacks
López played three seasons for the Isla de la Juventud in the Cuban National Series. He defected from Cuba in 2014 to pursue a career in Major League Baseball (MLB). In his final season in Cuba, he had a 3.12 earned run average (ERA) with 28 strikeouts in 49 innings pitched. He received interest from numerous teams, including the New York Yankees, San Francisco Giants and San Diego Padres before signing with the Arizona Diamondbacks. In 2015, he played for both the Arizona League Diamondbacks of the Rookie-level Arizona League and the Mobile BayBears of the Class AA Southern League, pitching to a combined 2-6 record and 4.17 ERA in 54 innings between both teams.

In 2016, López pitched for Mobile. He struggled, posting a 5.52 ERA in 62 innings, and left the team with the intention to retire. However, he returned to the organization in September 2016 to pitch for the Diamondbacks' Arizona League affiliate. He spent 2017 with the Visalia Rawhide of the Class A-Advanced California League and posted a 2-0 record with a 0.88 ERA along with 56 strikeouts in  innings. In 2018, he pitched for the Jackson Generals of the Southern League. 

The Diamondbacks promoted him to the major leagues on September 3. López faced the Atlanta Braves six days later in his major league debut, giving up 2 home runs and a triple in his first 8 pitches. In 2019, he pitched out of the bullpen for Arizona, appearing in 70 games. In 2020, López pitched to a 5.95 ERA with 16 strikeouts and 9 walks in 19.2 innings of work. After recording a 6.57 ERA in 13 appearances, López was designated for assignment on May 20, 2021.

Atlanta Braves
On May 22, 2021, López was traded to the Atlanta Braves in exchange for Deivi Estrada and was assigned to the Triple-A Gwinnett Stripers. In 32 appearances for Triple-A Gwinnett, López went 3-2 with a 3.03 ERA and 35 strikeouts. On November 22, López was designated for assignment by the Braves.

New York Mets
On November 29, 2021, López was claimed off of waivers by the Philadelphia Phillies. On March 16, 2022, López was designated for assignment by Philadelphia after the signing of Odúbel Herrera was made official. On March 18, he was claimed again, this time by the Miami Marlins. On March 27, 2022, Lopez was designated for assignment following the waiver claim of Tommy Nance. 

On March 29, 2022, López was claimed off of waivers for a third time, by the New York Mets. On May 2, López was suspended 3 games and fined following an incident which saw him intentionally throw a pitch at Philadelphia Phillies batter Kyle Schwarber.

He was released on December 21, 2022.

Yomiuri Giants
On December 22, 2022, Lopez signed with the Yomiuri Giants of Nippon Professional Baseball.

See also
List of baseball players who defected from Cuba

References

External links

1993 births
Living people
Arizona Diamondbacks players
Arizona League Diamondbacks players
Cuban expatriate baseball players in the United States
Defecting Cuban baseball players
Isla de la Juventud players
Jackson Generals (Southern League) players
Major League Baseball pitchers
Major League Baseball players from Cuba
Mobile BayBears players
New York Mets players
People from Nueva Gerona
Salt River Rafters players
Toronjeros de Isla de la Juventud players
Visalia Rawhide players